Orchid Tapes is a Canadian–American independent record label based in New York City. It was founded in 2010 in Toronto, Ontario by Warren Hildebrand. Operated by Hildebrand, the label has released a number of indie compilations and original releases on cassette tape, limited edition vinyl, and digital download. Among Orchid Tapes' signed artists are Coma Cinema, Foxes in Fiction, and Alex G. The label focuses on "music and artwork that breaks free of the established norm...reflects the dedication of its creator and provokes a strong emotional resonance..."

History

Founding
Orchid Tapes was first founded in 2010 by Warren Hildebrand, while Hildebrand was attending an art university in Toronto, Ontario. He had first started putting the idea for a label together in 2009, and had picked the name Orchid Tapes partly after a song by the band Deerhunter, called "Tape Hiss Orchid." According to Hildebrand, "I was really inspired by all the little cassette labels that were popping up on different blogs around that time. It seemed like a really cheap and easy way to get music out into the world beyond just the proliferation of mp3s."

He founded Orchid Tapes while living in his apartment in downtown Toronto and working on the debut album of his solo project, Foxes in Fiction. Hildebrand had started Foxes in Fiction in April 2005 while still in high school, and began to take the project more seriously in 2008, while inspired by artists such as Brian Eno and Atlas Sound.

First album
Hildebrand states that the label was originally started as a vehicle for his solo project, Foxes in Fiction. The label's first release was the Foxes in Fiction album Swung from The Branches, released on February 19, 2010. The album became a surprise hit on the internet, eventually being covered by Pitchfork.

Many of the other early bands signed to the label met Hildebrand through MySpace. According to Hildebrand, "It felt good meeting a group of other sad weirdos that recorded music from home that I felt like I genuinely connected with, even through something as seemingly alienating as the Internet."

Move to New York
In 2012, Hildebrand moved from Toronto to New York. Brian Vu joined the label later that year, helping expand the roster and the label's scope. For most of the label's lifespan, Hildebrand would dub each cassette tape on his stereo tape deck, a several-day process he was still using after the 20th release. Finally in the fall of 2013, he purchased a cassette duplicator for the label. According to No Fear of Pop in 2013, "Orchid Tapes embodies the D.I.Y. aesthetic that has implanted itself on the internet. Digital downloads are always free and cassette prices are reasonable, and the quality of music is so good that it entices intrigued listeners to search through the rest of the catalog."

Orchid Tapes states on its website that it seeks "music and artwork that breaks free of the established norm, disregards trends, reflects the dedication of its creator and provokes a strong emotional resonance within whoever experiences it."

The label's first release on vinyl was the Three Love Songs LP by Ricky Eat Acid, released in late 2013 with limited copies available. According to Noisey in January 2014, "a largely ambient project from Maryland's Sam Ray, Three Love Songs sold out its pre-release vinyl run on the up-and-coming Orchid Tapes label in two days." Noisey reviewed the album positively, stating "Featherweight electronics, aching piano, snippets of speech, even a pitched up Drake sample swirl around in a stew of delicately rendered pathos."

In February 2014, the label released Virgo Indigo by Fog Lake, which is the solo project of Aaron Powell from Newfoundland. The album was mastered by Hildebrand. Later that month, the label released the vinyl compilation Boring Ecstasy, which features tracks by artists such as Alex G, Ricky Eat Acid, R.L. Kelly, Home Alone, and Four Visions.

As of 2016, Orchid Tapes has been solely operated by Warren Hildebrand.

Showcases
Orchid Tapes periodically organizes and hosts musical showcases, with three in 2013 alone. Venues have included Hildebrand's rooftop, a 100-year-old synagogue in Los Angeles, in conjunction with The L.A. Fort and multiple New York venues. For the March 2014 release of Boring Ecstasy, artists including Elvis Depressedly, Alex G, Ricky Eat Acid, R.L. Kelly, Home Alone, and Four Visions played a showcase at Brooklyn music venue Shea Stadium (named for the much larger stadium of the same name).

Artists

Current
Apollo Vermouth
Balam Acab
Blithe Field
Fog Lake
Ghost Orchard
Foxes in Fiction
R.L. Kelly
Yohuna

Previous
Julia Brown
Alex G

Discography

Further reading
Interviews

References

External links

Canadian independent record labels
Record labels established in 2010
American independent record labels